Vincit is an unincorporated community in Dunklin County, in the U.S. state of Missouri.

History
A post office called Vincit was established in 1880, and remained in operation until 1909. The origin of the name Vincit is uncertain.

References

Unincorporated communities in Dunklin County, Missouri
Unincorporated communities in Missouri